Whitcastles or Little Hartfell is a stone circle 6½ miles NE of Lockerbie, Dumfries and Galloway. Nine fallen stones lie in an oval measuring 55m by 45m. The largest stones lie to the north and south of the circle; interest in cardinal points is a common feature in the stone circles of the Solway Firth. It was designated as a scheduled monument in 1937.

See also 
Stone circles in the British Isles and Brittany
List of stone circles

References

Stone circles in Dumfries and Galloway
Scheduled Ancient Monuments in Dumfries and Galloway